Sonali Nikam is an Indian television actress. She is best known for playing the lead role Jassi in her show Aadhe Adhoore, which explored infidelity in rural India. Before her breakthrough role as Jassi, she has essayed parallel lead roles in many hit TV series such as Geet Hui Sabse Parayee and Pyaar Ka Dard Hai Meetha Meetha Pyaara Pyaara.

She was most recently seen as the female lead in the & TV show Ek Vivah Aisa Bhi in 2017.  in 2020 she played in Qurbaan hua as saraswati neel's sister after that she played at mauka-e-vardat and she played in Harphoul mohini show as shalini in 2022

Filmography

Television

See also
 List of Indian television actresses

References

External links

Living people
Actresses in Hindi television
Indian television actresses
Indian soap opera actresses
Year of birth missing (living people)
21st-century Indian actresses